Leo Donald Wells (July 18, 1917 in Kansas City, Kansas – June 23, 2006) played in 80 games for the Chicago White Sox in two seasons separated by a three-year stint in the military during World War II.

An infielder standing 5' 9" and weighing 170 lb., he split his time between third base and shortstop.  At the latter, he accepted 38 chances in 14 games without making an error for a 1.000 fielding percentage.

In his first season, he played 35 games, batting .194 with one home run and four RBIs. Rejoining the ChiSox in 1946, he hit another home run and drove in 11 runs, batting .189 over 45 games.

Wells died on June 23, 2006 in St. Paul, Minnesota.

References
Baseball-Reference.com: Leo Wells
Obituary, Sports Collectors Digest, Krause Publications, November 10, 2006.

1917 births
2006 deaths
Sportspeople from Kansas City, Kansas
Chicago White Sox players
San Diego Padres (minor league) players
Major League Baseball infielders
Baseball players from Kansas